The ancient Egyptian calendar – a civil calendar – was a solar calendar with a 365-day year. The year consisted of three seasons of 120 days each, plus an intercalary month of five epagomenal days treated as outside of the year proper. Each season was divided into four months of 30 days. These twelve months were initially numbered within each season but came to also be known by the names of their principal festivals. Each month was divided into three 10-day periods known as decans or decades. It has been suggested that during the Nineteenth Dynasty and the Twentieth Dynasty the last two days of each decan were usually treated as a kind of weekend for the royal craftsmen, with royal artisans free from work.

Because this calendrical year was nearly a quarter of a day shorter than the solar year, the Egyptian calendar lost about one day every four years relative to the Gregorian calendar. 's Canopus Decree attempted to correct this through the introduction of a sixth epagomenal day every four years but the proposal was resisted by the Egyptian priests and people and abandoned until the establishment of the Alexandrian or Coptic calendar by Augustus. The introduction of a leap day to the Egyptian calendar made it equivalent to the reformed Julian calendar, although by extension it continues to diverge from the Gregorian calendar at the turn of most centuries.

Some Egyptologists have described it as lunisolar, with an intercalary month supposedly added every two or three years to maintain its consistency with the solar year, but no evidence of such intercalation before the  has yet been discovered.

History

Prehistory

Current understanding of the earliest development of the Egyptian calendar remains speculative. Similarly, based on the Palermo Stone, Alexander Scharff proposed that the Old Kingdom observed a 320-day year, but his theory has not been widely accepted. Some evidence suggests the early civil calendar had 360 days, although it might merely reflect the unusual status of the five epagomenal days as days "added on" to the proper year.

With its interior effectively rainless for thousands of years, ancient Egypt was "a gift of the river" Nile, whose annual flooding organized the natural year into three broad natural seasons known to the Egyptians as:

Inundation or Flood (sometimes anglicized as Akhet): roughly from September to January. 
Emergence or Winter (sometimes anglicized as Peret): roughly from January to May.
Low Water or Harvest or Summer (sometimes anglicized as Shemu): roughly from May to September.

As early as the reign of Djer (BC, Dynasty I), yearly records were being kept of the flood's high-water mark. Otto E. Neugebauer noted that a 365-day year can be established by averaging a few decades of accurate observations of the Nile flood without any need for astronomical observations, although the great irregularity of the flood from year to year and the difficulty of maintaining a sufficiently accurate Nilometer and record in prehistoric Egypt has caused other scholars to doubt that it formed the basis for the Egyptian calendar.

Lunar calendar

The Egyptians appear to have used a purely lunar calendar prior to the establishment of the solar civil calendar in which each month began on the morning when the waning crescent moon could no longer be seen. Until the closing of Egypt's polytheist temples under the Byzantines, the lunar calendar continued to be used as the liturgical year of various cults. The lunar calendar divided the month into four weeks, reflecting each quarter of the lunar phases. Because the exact time of morning considered to begin the Egyptian day remains uncertain and there is no evidence that any method other than observation was used to determine the beginnings of the lunar months prior to the  there is no sure way to reconstruct exact dates in the lunar calendar from its known dates. The difference between beginning the day at the first light of dawn or at sunrise accounts for an 11–14 year shift in dated observations of the lunar cycle. It remains unknown how the Egyptians dealt with obscurement by clouds when they occurred and the best current algorithms have been shown to differ from actual observation of the waning crescent moon in about one-in-five cases.

Parker and others have argued for its development into an observational and then calculated lunisolar calendar which used a 30 day intercalary month every two to three years to accommodate the lunar year's loss of about 11 days a year relative to the solar year and to maintain the placement of the heliacal rising of Sirius within its twelfth month. No evidence for such a month, however, exists in the present historical record.

A second lunar calendar is attested by a demotic astronomical papyrus dating to sometime after 144 AD which outlines a lunisolar calendar operating in accordance with the Egyptian civil calendar according to a 25 year cycle. The calendar seems to show its month beginning with the first visibility of the waxing crescent moon, but Parker displayed an error in the cycle of about a day in 500 years, using it to show the cycle was developed to correspond with the new moon around 357BC. This date places it prior to the Ptolemaic period and within the native Egyptian Dynasty XXX. Egypt's 1st Persian occupation, however, seems likely to have been its inspiration. This lunisolar calendar's calculations apparently continued to be used without correction into the Roman period, even when they no longer precisely matched the observable lunar phases.

The days of the lunar month — known to the Egyptians as a "temple month" — were individually named and celebrated as stages in the life of the moon god, variously Thoth in the Middle Kingdom or Khonsu in the Ptolemaic era: "He ... is conceived ... on Psḏntyw; he is born on Ꜣbd; he grows old after Smdt".

Civil calendar

The civil calendar was established at some early date in or before the Old Kingdom, with probable evidence of its use early in the reign of Shepseskaf (BC, Dynasty IV) and certain attestation during the reign of Neferirkare (mid-25th centuryBC, Dynasty V). It was probably based upon astronomical observations of Sirius whose reappearance in the sky closely corresponded to the average onset of the Nile flood through the 5th and  A recent development is the discovery that the 30-day month of the Mesopotamian calendar dates as late as the Jemdet Nasr Period (late 4th-millenniumBC), a time Egyptian culture was borrowing various objects and cultural features from the Fertile Crescent, leaving open the possibility that the main features of the calendar were borrowed in one direction or the other as well.

The civil year comprised exactly 365 days, divided into 12 months of 30 days each and an intercalary month of five days, were celebrated as the birthdays of the gods Osiris, Horus, Set, Isis, and Nephthys. The regular months were grouped into Egypt's three seasons, which gave them their original names, and divided into three 10-day periods known as decans or decades. In later sources, these were distinguished as "first", "middle", and "last". It has been suggested that during the Nineteenth Dynasty and the Twentieth Dynasty the last two days of each decan were usually treated as a kind of weekend for the royal craftsmen, with royal artisans free from work. Dates were typically expressed in a YMD format, with a pharaoh's regnal year followed by the month followed by the day of the month. For example, the New Year occurred on 

The importance of the calendar to Egyptian religion is reflected in the use of the title "Lord of Years" for its various creator gods. Time was also considered an integral aspect of Maat, the cosmic order which opposed chaos, lies, and violence.

The civil calendar was apparently established in a year when Sirius rose on its New Year  but, because of its lack of leap years, it began to slowly cycle backwards through the solar year. Sirius itself, about 40° below the ecliptic, follows a Sothic year almost exactly matching that of the Sun, with its reappearance now occurring at the latitude of Cairo (ancient Heliopolis and Memphis) on 19July (Julian), only two or three days later than its occurrence in early antiquity.

Following Censorinus and Meyer, the standard understanding was that, four years from the calendar's inception, Sirius would have no longer reappeared on the Egyptian New Year but on the next day ; four years later, it would have reappeared on the day after that; and so on through the entire calendar until its rise finally returned to  1460 years after the calendar's inception, an event known as "apocatastasis". Owing to the event's extreme regularity, Egyptian recordings of the calendrical date of the rise of Sirius have been used by Egyptologists to fix its calendar and other events dated to it, at least to the level of the four-Egyptian-year periods which share the same date for Sirius's return, known as "tetraëterides" or "quadrennia". For example, an account that Sothis rose on —the 181st day of the year—should show that somewhere 720, 721, 722, or 723 years have passed since the last apocatastasis. Censorinus's placement of an apocatastasis on 21July AD139 permitted the calculation of its predecessors to 1322, 2782, and 4242BC. The last is sometimes described as "the first exactly dated year in history" but, since the calendar is attested before Dynasty XVIII and the last date is now known to far predate early Egyptian civilization, it is typically credited to Dynasty II around the middle date.

The classic understanding of the Sothic cycle relies, however, on several potentially erroneous assumptions. Following Scaliger, Censorinus's date is usually emended to 20July but ancient authorities give a variety of 'fixed' dates for the rise of Sirius. His use of the year 139 seems questionable, as 136 seems to have been the start of the tetraëteris and the later date chosen to flatter the birthday of Censorinus's patron. Perfect observation of Sirius's actual behavior during the cycle—including its minor shift relative to the solar year—would produce a period of 1457 years; observational difficulties produce a further margin of error of about two decades. Although it is certain the Egyptian day began in the morning, another four years are shifted depending on whether the precise start occurred at the first light of dawn or at sunrise. It has been noted that there is no recognition in surviving records that Sirius's minor irregularities sometimes produce a triëteris or penteteris (three- or five-year periods of agreement with an Egyptian date) rather than the usual four-year periods and, given that the expected discrepancy is no more than 8 years in 1460, the cycle may have been applied schematically according to the civil years by Egyptians and the Julian year by the Greeks and Romans. The occurrence of the apocatastasis in the  so close to the great political and sun-based religious reforms of /Akhenaton also leaves open the possibility that the cycle's strict application was occasionally subject to political interference. The record and celebration of Sirius's rising would also vary by several days (equating to decades of the cycle) in eras when the official site of observation was moved from near Cairo. The return of Sirius to the night sky varies by about a day per degree of latitude, causing it to be seen 8–10 days earlier at Aswan than at Alexandria, a difference which causes Rolf Krauss to propose dating much of Egyptian history decades later than the present consensus.

Ptolemaic calendar
Following Alexander the Great's conquest of the Persian Empire, the Macedonian Ptolemaic Dynasty came to power in Egypt, continuing to use its native calendars with Hellenized names. In 238 BC, Ptolemy III's Canopus Decree ordered that every 4th year should incorporate a sixth day in its intercalary month, honoring him and his wife as gods equivalent to the children of Nut. The reform was resisted by the Egyptian priests and people and was abandoned.

Coptic calendar

Egyptian scholars were involved with the establishment of Julius Caesar's reform of the Roman calendar, although the Roman priests initially misapplied its formula and—by counting inclusively—added leap days every three years instead of every four. The mistake was corrected by Augustus through omitting leap years for a number of cycles until AD4. As the personal ruler of Egypt, he also imposed a reform of its calendar in 26 or 25BC, possibly to correspond with the beginning of a new Callipic cycle, with the first leap day occurring on 6 Epag. in the year 22BC. This "Alexandrian calendar" corresponds almost exactly to the Julian, causing 1Thoth to remain at 29August except during the year before a Julian leap year, when it occurs on 30August instead. The calendars then resume their correspondence after 4Phamenoth/ 29February of the next year.

Months
For much of Egyptian history, the months were not referred to by individual names, but were rather numbered within the three seasons. As early as the Middle Kingdom, however, each month had its own name. These finally evolved into the New Kingdom months, which in turn gave rise to the Hellenized names that were used for chronology by Ptolemy in his Almagest and by others. Copernicus constructed his tables for the motion of the planets based on the Egyptian year because of its mathematical regularity. A convention of modern Egyptologists is to number the months consecutively using Roman numerals.

A persistent problem of Egyptology has been that the festivals which give their names to the months occur in the next month. Alan Gardiner proposed that an original calendar governed by the priests of Ra was supplanted by an improvement developed by the partisans of Thoth. Parker connected the discrepancy to his theories concerning the lunar calendar. Sethe, Weill, and Clagett proposed that the names expressed the idea that each month culminated in the festival beginning the next.

Legacy

The reformed Egyptian calendar continues to be used in Egypt as the Coptic calendar of the Egyptian Church and by the Egyptian populace at large, particularly the fellah, to calculate the agricultural seasons. It differs only in its era, which is dated from the ascension of the Roman emperor Diocletian. Contemporary Egyptian farmers, like their ancient predecessors, divide the year into three seasons: winter, summer, and inundation. It is also associated with local festivals such as the annual Flooding of the Nile and the ancient Spring festival Sham el-Nessim.

The Ethiopian calendar is based on this reformed calendar but uses Amharic names for its months and uses a different era. The French Republican Calendar was similar, but began its year at the autumnal equinox. British orrery maker John Gleave represented the Egyptian calendar in a reconstruction of the Antikythera mechanism.

See also 
 Egyptian chronology
 Egyptian astronomy
 Coptic and Ethiopian calendars

Notes

References

Citations

Bibliography
 .
 .
 . (Full Hungarian version.)
 .
 , a review of Clagett's Ancient Egyptian Science, Vols. I & II.
 .
 .
 .
 . 
 .
 .
 .
 .
 .
 .
 .

External links 
 Detailed information about the Egyptian calendars, including lunar cycles
 Date Converter for Ancient Egypt
 Calendrica Includes the Egyptian civil calendar with years in Ptolemy's Nabonassar Era (year 1 = 747 BC) as well as the Coptic, Ethiopic, and French calendars.
 Civil, ver. 4.0, is a 25kB DOS program to convert dates in the Egyptian civil calendar to the Julian or Gregorian ones 

 
30th-century BC establishments
Solar calendars
Ancient calendars